Apporo Dam  is a trapezoidal dam located in Hokkaido Prefecture in Japan. The dam is used for flood control, irrigation and water supply. The catchment area of the dam is 105.3 km2. The dam impounds about 303  ha of land when full and can store 47400 thousand cubic meters of water. The construction of the dam was started on 1986 and completed in 2018.

References

Dams in Hokkaido